Mballa Zambo (born January 6, 1987) is a Cameroonian football goalkeeper. He plays for Thai Division 2 League clubside Chainat FC. In 2008, he joined Samut Songkhram of the Thai Premier League.

References

1987 births
Living people
Cameroonian footballers
Footballers from Douala
Expatriate footballers in Thailand
Association football goalkeepers
Mballa Zambo
Mballa Zambo